David Drisko Hall (born 1936) is an American historian, and was Bartlett Professor of New England Church History, at Harvard Divinity School.

Life
Hall was born on July 8, 1936. He graduated from Harvard University, and from Yale University with a PhD. He is well known for introducing lived religion to religious studies scholarship in the United States, most notably at Harvard Divinity School.

Awards
 1991 Merle Curti Award

Works
 The Faithful Shepherd: A History of the New England Ministry in the Seventeenth Century, Omohundro Institute, 1972 (Harvard Divinity School, 2006)
   (Harvard University Press, 1990)

Editor
 
 
   (reprint Duke University Press, 2005)

Criticism
"Review: Toleration", William & Mary Quarterly, April 2009

References

Harvard University alumni
Yale University alumni
Harvard Divinity School faculty
Living people
21st-century American historians
American male non-fiction writers
21st-century American male writers
1936 births